The Moonbase is the half-missing sixth serial of the fourth season in the British science fiction television series Doctor Who, which was first broadcast in four weekly parts from 11 February to 4 March 1967.

In this serial, the Second Doctor (Patrick Troughton) and his travelling companions Ben (Michael Craze), Polly (Anneke Wills) and Jamie McCrimmon (Frazer Hines) arrive on the Human colonised Moon in 2070, where the Cybermen plot to take over the base and use it to invade the Earth. This story features the return, and first redesign, of the Cybermen.

It was the fifth incomplete Doctor Who serial to be released with full-length animated reconstructions of its two missing episodes.

Plot

The TARDIS lands on the Moon in the year 2070; dressed in spacesuits, the Second Doctor and his companions Ben, Polly and Jamie venture outside to explore the low-gravity environment. While they play, Jamie is injured.

Some workers from the nearby Moonbase find Jamie and bring him inside for treatment while the remaining TARDIS crew follows. The time travellers learn that the Moonbase uses a machine called the Graviton to track and manage weather on Earth. Their arrival is ill-timed, as members of the international crew, led by the bullish Hobson, have begun to collapse under the influence of an unknown pathogen.

While International Space Control quarantines the Moonbase, the Doctor starts to investigate. Before he dies, the station's patient zero – their staff doctor, Evans – rants about a "silver hand". Another crew member, Ralph, then vanishes in the food stores, and the crew learn that their radio transmissions are being monitored from elsewhere on the Moon.

In the sickbay a feverish Jamie begins to rant about a "Phantom Piper", a figure said to appear to a McCrimmon before death. While attending to Jamie, Polly sees a large figure leave through the door. When Hobson, the Doctor, Ben, John and Nils arrive to collect Evans' body, it has disappeared. They then leave to investigate where this 'piper' is. Polly goes to get water, and Jamie wakes up to see the 'piper' advancing on him.

The 'piper' ignores Jamie, as he doesn't have the disease, so he steals another patient and leaves. Polly comes back in just as the figure is leaving and recognises it as a Cyberman, and the Doctor realises their old enemies are taking the patients' bodies. Hobson brushes away the cyber-story, believing they died out years ago. He gives the Doctor 24 hours to discover the cause of the virus, or else he and his companions must leave.

While Hobson deals with the Gravitron, which is becoming difficult to control with fewer staff, the Doctor focuses on the cause of the viral disease. In the sickbay, Polly and Jamie are attacked by a Cyberman, which stuns them with electricity from his hand and leaves with another patient's body.

The Gravitron isn't working because some antennae on the Moon's surface are broken. Jules and Franz go out to fix them but are ambushed by two Cybermen and beaten to death. The Doctor can't work out the cause of the disease and is ordered to leave by Hobson. Polly makes some coffee and another crew member gets infected. The Doctor works out that the neurotropic virus has been spread through infected sugar from the food stores and is an organised scheme to destabilise the crew. A Cyberman who had been posing as a patient in bed reveals himself and aims his gun at them.

Another Cyberman emerges and kills Bob when he tries to attack the other with a metal bar. The Cybermen recognise the Doctor and use their weapons to take control of the central control centre of the Moonbase while confining Polly and Ben to the sickbay. The Cybermen reveal that they want to use the Gravitron to destroy all life on Earth by altering the weather.

On board the cyber-ship Evans, Jules and Ralph are conditioned to obey the Cybermen like zombie slaves. They are taken to the base and are sent into the heart of the Gravitron to subvert it. The Cybermen have been entering and leaving the base using a tunnel that goes into the food stores, explaining the drops in air pressure.

Using fire extinguishers, nail varnish remover and other objects that dissolve plastic, Ben, Polly and a recovered Jamie lead a fightback from their incarceration in the medical wing. The three Cybermen in the initial attack force are destroyed.

Benoit goes outside to see what happened to Jules and Franz. He only finds their spacesuits, and is chased by a Cyberman. Ben puts some of the solvent in a bottle and goes out. He then throws the bottle at the Cyberman's chest unit, killing it and saving Benoit. The crew block off the hole in the food stores to prevent more Cybermen entering. The cybership is located, but a large squad of Cybermen start advancing on the Moonbase.

Two Cybermen on the surface damage the aerial, preventing the Moonbase from contacting Earth; however, a relief ship is on the way. The Cybermen use radio beams to reactivate their zombies inside the base, who infiltrate the Gravitron and use it to deflect the relief ship into the sun. A hole is blasted in the wall, which depressurises the base, but Hobson and Benoit use a coffee tray to plug the leak. The depressurisation deactivates Evans and the other zombies.

Two more cyberships arrive. The Cybermen already on the surface erect a large laser cannon and threaten to blow the base open unless the entry port is opened within 10 seconds. They fire, but the beam is deflected by the Gravitron. Another large squad from one of the other cyberships take up positions around the base. With the help of Hobson, Polly and Benoit, the Doctor points the Gravitron at the lunar surface, which blasts the Cybermen and their ships into space.

As Hobson and his team reorient the Gravitron to its proper use, the Doctor and his companions slip away. Back in the TARDIS, they dematerialise and then activate the rarely used time scanner to reveal a monstrous claw waving around.

Production
The working titles of this story were Cybermen and The Return of the Cybermen.  It was commissioned before the last episode of The Tenth Planet was broadcast, to take advantage of the strong positive response to the Cybermen. When Pedler was commissioned to write a second Cyberman story, one of the requirements was that the story should have only one large set and a limited number of smaller sets. The first draft of the script was written before it was decided that Frazer Hines would be a regular cast member. As a result, the character of Jamie had to be worked into a script that didn't have much room for him. So in the first two episodes, Jamie spends much of the time in the sickbay. In the last two episodes, some of Ben's dialogue was given to him.

The first three episodes were recorded on successive Saturdays at Doctor Who's then regular home of Riverside 1, but for Episode 4 it moved back to Lime Grove D. A final clip, used to carry the story into the subsequent adventure, The Macra Terror, was filmed separately during the making of that story, as the Macra prop was too large to be brought into the studio.

This story is also the last story to use the original title sequence that had been in use since the first serial; the next serial introduced a new sequence with different howlaround patterns that incorporated Troughton's face.

Cast notes
This story features the debut of actor John Levene (uncredited) as a Cyberman. Levene would return as a Yeti in The Web of Fear (1968), and would go on to play the regular character Sergeant Benton. John Rolfe had previously appeared in The War Machines (1966) and would appear again in The Green Death (1973).  Alan Rowe was cast as Doctor Evans, an early victim of the space plague and also provided the voice of Space Control.  He later appeared in The Time Warrior (1974), Horror of Fang Rock (1977) and Full Circle (1980).

Broadcast and reception

 Episode is missing

Paul Cornell, Martin Day, and Keith Topping gave the serial an unfavourable review in The Discontinuity Guide (1995), writing that it was "illogical and boring, reducing the Cybermen to the role of intergalactic gangsters". In The Television Companion (1998), David J. Howe and Stephen James Walker noted that it was a remake of The Tenth Planet but was "far superior" in the way the Cybermen were portrayed. They also praised the music, acting, and the shots on the Moon, but they felt the direction was "lacklustre" in places and called the shots of the Cyberman ship landing "amongst the worst ever seen in Doctor Who". In 2009, Patrick Mulkern of Radio Times also praised the redesigned Cybermen and the atmosphere. He wrote that the scripts "impart dollops of science without jarring and allow for a good deal of incident and suspense". AV Club's Christopher Bahn said "Whatever flaws it may have, and it’s far from perfect, "The Moonbase" has more than enough going for it to earn a place as one of the must-see serials of the Second Doctor era." In 2010, SFX named the resolution of patching the hole in the Moonbase with a drinks tray as one of the silliest moments in Doctor Who history. In a 2010 article, Charlie Jane Anders of io9 listed the cliffhanger to the third episode — in which the Cybermen march across the Moon's surface towards the base — as one of the greatest cliffhangers in the history of Doctor Who.

Commercial releases

In print

A novelisation of this serial written by Gerry Davis was published by Target Books in February 1975 under the title Doctor Who and the Cybermen. Davis opens the book with a lengthy history of the Cybermen and updates Ben and Polly to readers from the 1970s. A Turkish translation was published in 1975.

Home media
In July 1992, episodes 2 and 4 of this story were released on VHS as part of the video Cybermen – The Early Years. In November 2004, they were included in the Lost in Time DVD set, along with the audio tracks for episodes 1 and 3.

As with all missing episodes, off-air recordings of the soundtrack exist due to contemporary fan efforts. In April 2001 these were released on CD, accompanied by linking narration from Frazer Hines.

This serial was set to be released on DVD on 21 October 2013, with episodes 1 and 3 represented by new animation from Planet 55 Studios; however, production delays set back the release until 20 January 2014.

References

External links

Photonovel of The Moonbase on the BBC website

Target novelisation

Second Doctor serials
Cybermen television stories
Doctor Who missing episodes
Doctor Who serials novelised by Gerry Davis
1967 British television episodes
Fiction set on the Moon
Fiction set in 2070
 Doctor Who stories set on the Moon